Access rights may refer to:

Access rights (medieval law), the right of a liege lord to use a vassal's castle, fortified house or fortified town in time of conflict
Freedom to roam, the right to access public land
Access to Information Act, a Canadian act that allows public access to government information
Disability rights movement, disabled access to public and private locations is a key issue
Access control, the ability to permit or deny the use of something by someone
File system permissions, security control over file access in computer operating systems
Harvey v. Horan, a U.S. Federal Court case which decided right of access to DNA testing
Right of public access to the wilderness

See also
Access (disambiguation)
Accessibility
Entitlement
Limited-access road
Open access (disambiguation)
 Public access (disambiguation)